KNSA may refer to:

 KNSA (AM), a radio station (930 AM) licensed to Unalakleet, Alaska, United States
 Koninklijke Nederlandse Schutters Associatie